Tooheys Pils was an Australian pilsner produced by Tooheys. It was launched in November 1998, and ceased production in late 2011. It was originally brewed with Saaz hops; however, due to production and supply issues, it was later brewed with Hallertau hops from Bavaria, Germany. It was described as a light, refreshing beer with a crisp, hoppy finish without a lingering aftertaste. By June 2008, Tooheys had decided to lessen the alcohol content to 4.5% and give the bottle a more appealing look.

See also

Australian pub
Beer in Australia
List of breweries in Australia

References

Kirin Group
Australian beer brands
Products introduced in 1998